Aspidistra nutans is a flowering monocotyledonous plant in the genus Aspidistra, in the asparagus family, Asparagaceae.

Distribution 
The native range of Aspidistra nutans is from Yunnan province in China, to Northwestern Vietnam.

References 

nutans